Sesostris, also transliterated as Sesoösis, or Sesonchosis, is the name of a legendary king of ancient Egypt who, according to Herodotus, led a military expedition into parts of Europe. Tales of Sesostris are probably based on the life of Senusret I , Senusret III and perhaps other Pharaohs such as Sheshonq I and Ramesses II.

Account of Herodotus 
In Herodotus' Histories there appears a story told by Egyptian priests about a Pharaoh Sesostris, who once led an army northward overland to Asia Minor, then fought his way westward until he crossed into Europe, where he defeated the Scythians and Thracians (possibly in modern Romania and Bulgaria). Sesostris then returned home, leaving colonists behind at the river Phasis in Colchis. Herodotus cautioned the reader that much of this story came second hand via Egyptian priests, but also noted that the Colchians were commonly believed to be Egyptian colonists.

Herodotus also relates that when Sesostris defeated an army without much resistance he erected a pillar in their capital with a vulva on it to symbolize the fact that the army fought like women. Pliny the Elder also makes mention of Sesostris, who, he claims, was defeated by Saulaces, a gold-rich king of Colchis.

Herodotus describes Sesostris as the father of the blind king Pheron, who was less warlike than his father.

According to Professor Alan Lloyd 'The core of Herodotus’ narrative is provided by an Egyptian tradition which presented Sesostris as a model of the ideal of kingship. This certainly contained an historical element, but it has been supplemented and contaminated by folklore, nationalist propaganda, and Greek attitudes."

Diodorus Siculus
According to Diodorus Siculus (who calls him Sesoosis) and Strabo, he conquered the whole world, even Scythia and Ethiopia, divided Egypt into administrative districts or nomes, was a great law-giver, and introduced a caste system into Egypt and the worship of Serapis. Diodorus also wrote that "with regard to this king not only are the Greek writers at variance with one another, but also among the Egyptians the priests and the poets who sing his praises give conflicting stories” (1.53).

Modern research
In Manetho's Aegyptiaca (History of Egypt), a pharaoh called "Sesostris" occupied the same position as the known pharaoh Senusret III of the Twelfth Dynasty, and his name is now usually viewed as a corruption of Senusret/Senwosret/Senwosri. In fact, he is commonly believed to be based on Senusret III, with the possible addition of memories of other namesake pharaohs of the same dynasty, as well as Seti I and Ramesses II of the much later Nineteenth Dynasty.

The images of Sesostris carved in stone in Ionia which Herodotus said he had seen are likely to be identified with the Luwian inscriptions of Karabel Pass, the Karabel relief, now known to have been carved by Tarkasnawa, king of the Arzawan rump state of Mira. The kings of the Eighteenth and Nineteenth dynasties were possibly the greatest conquerors that Egypt  ever produced, and their records are much clearer than the older dynasties on the limits of Egyptian expansion. Senusret III raided into the Levant as far as Shechem, also into Ethiopia, and at Semna above the second cataract set up a stela of conquest that in its expressions recalls the stelae of Sesostris in Herodotus: Sesostris may, therefore, be the highly magnified portrait of this Pharaoh.

Sesostris is also mentioned in the Alexander Romance where Alexander is described as "the new Sesostris, ruler of the world.

See also
 War of Vesosis and Tanausis
 Sesostris (play): a play based on the life of Sesostris

References

Bibliography 
 Herodotus ii. 102-1ll 
 Diodorus Siculus i. 53-59
 Strabo xv. p. 687 
 Kurt Sethe, "Sesostris," in Unters. z. Gesch. u. Altertumskunde Agyptens, tome ii.  Hinrichs, Leipzig (1900).

Kings of Egypt in Greek mythology
Kings of Egypt in Herodotus
Senusret III